Jersey Village is a city in west-central Harris County, Texas, United States, located at U.S. Highway 290, Farm to Market Road 529, and the Southern Pacific Railroad. The city is located in the Houston–Sugar Land–Baytown metropolitan area. The population was 7,921 at the 2020 census.

History

The 1936 Harris County highway map indicated several residences in the area. Clark W. Henry owned  of land on which he operated F&M Dairy and raised Jersey cattle. Henry discontinued his dairy when his health declined, and he gave the land up so a residential community could be built in 1953. Henry and LeRoy Kennedy, members of the Garden Oaks Baptist Church, began developing the community in February 1954. At first the city had  of streets and drainage, gas, sewage, and water services. Several houses were established along Jersey Drive. The first family moved to the subdivision in late October 1954. The community developed a school, a park, and an 18-hole golf course. Jersey Village incorporated on April 16, 1956, with all 58 votes in favor of incorporation and a volunteer police force. Because of the incorporation, Houston did not incorporate Jersey Village's territory into its city limits.

In 1961 Jersey Village had 493 residents. On July 6, 1972, Leonard Rauch gave Jersey Village a city hall building; as of 2008 the building is used for the fire department and public works departments. In 1977 the city passed a bond issue, leading it to construct a new city hall, a city garage, a park pavilion, and an expansion of the fire department building. In 1980 the city had 966 residents. In 1982 this figure increased to 4,084. In August 1986 officials announced that the city passed a home rule charter with a passing vote of 306–36. Under a home rule charter Jersey Village gained more taxation and governing powers than it had as a general law city. In 1988 the population increased to 5,143. In 1990 Jersey Village had 4,938 residents.

Geography

Jersey Village is located at  (29.890569, –95.568579).

Demographics

As of the 2020 United States census, there were 7,921 people, 3,465 households, and 2,217 families residing in the city.

As of the census of 2000, there were 6,880 people, 2,840 households, and 1,942 families residing in the city. The population density was 2,014.3 people per square mile (776.7/km2). There were 3,037 housing units at an average density of 889.2/sq mi (342.9/km2). The racial makeup of the city was 86.6% White, 4.1% African American, 0.1% Native American, 5.09% Asian, 0.06% Pacific Islander, 2.43% from other races, and 1.51% from two or more races. Hispanic or Latino of any race were 7.3% of the population.

There were 2,840 households, out of which 29.0% had children under the age of 18 living with them, 59.6% were married couples living together, 6.2% had a female householder with no husband present, and 31.6% were non-families. 24.8% of all households were made up of individuals, and 2.5% had someone living alone who was 65 years of age or older. The average household size was 2.42 and the average family size was 2.94.

In the city, the population was spread out, with 22.0% under the age of 18, 8.8% from 18 to 24, 31.6% from 25 to 44, 30.0% from 45 to 64, and 7.6% who were 65 years of age or older. The median age was 38 years. For every 100 females, there were 97.9 males. For every 100 females age 18 and over, there were 96.5 males.

The median income for a household in the city was $68,431, and the median income for a family was $82,689. Males had a median income of $53,984 versus $37,616 for females. The per capita income for the city was $36,092. About 3.4% of families and 4.5% of the population were below the poverty line, including 6.4% of those under age 18 and 5.8% of those age 65 or over.

Government

Local government

Jersey Village has a home rule charter and a council manager form of government. The city manager acts as the city's chief executive officer. The council, consisting of the mayor and five elected members, serves as the city's legislative body and votes on matters related to city government. The mayor and each council member have two year terms. Each member is limited to four terms as mayor, council member, or both. The mayor votes if the city council has a tie vote. The city manager has no voice in the city council; the city manager attends all council meetings and provides advice. The city manager manages all city affairs assigned to the city manager by the charter, implements city council directives, and ordinances. The city manager also manages and directs the city organization and employees. As of March 2017, the city manager is Austin Bleess.

The council meets during the third Monday of each month at 7:00 PM in the auditorium of the Civic Center, which is located at 16327 Lakeview Drive. The city government, through its City Secretary, Lorri Coody, posts the council agendas 72 hours in advance on the city website and on its official bulletin board in the city. As of May 2021, the Mayor is Bobby Warren and the elected Council Members are Michelle Mitcham (Mayor Pro Tem), Drew Wasson, Sheri Sheppard, James Singleton, and Jennifer McCrea. Each Council Member is also appointed as a liaison to various city boards and commissions. Council Member Mitcham is assigned as Liaison to the Recreation and Events Committee, Council Member Sheppard is assigned as Liaison to the Golf Course Advisory Committee, Council Member McCrea is assigned as liaison to the Building Board of Adjustment and Appeals, and the Zoning Board of Adjustment, Council Member Singleton is assigned as Liaison to Tax Increment Reinvestment Zone Nos. 2 and 3, and Council Member Wasson is assigned as Liaison to the Planning and Zoning Commission and the Capital Improvements Advisory Committee. As of 2020 the Chief of Police is Kirk Riggs. Jersey Village Fire Department provides firefighting and EMS services to city residents. As of 2008 Mark Bitz serves as the Fire Chief.

County, state and federal representation
Jersey Village is within Harris County Precinct 3. Tom S. Ramsey, P.E. heads the precinct.

The city includes a regional office of the Texas Department of Public Safety.

Jersey Village is located in District 135 of the Texas House of Representatives. As of 2019, John Rosenthal represents the district. Jersey Village is within District 7 of the Texas Senate; as of 2015 Paul Bettencourt represents the district.

Jersey Village is in Texas's 7th congressional district. As of 2018, Lizzie Fletcher represents the district. The United States Postal Service operates the nearby Fairbanks Post Office at 7050 Brookhollow West Drive in an unincorporated area. The zip code is 77040.

Postal addresses in Jersey Village are designated as "Houston, Texas." Using "Jersey Village, Texas" is acceptable for Jersey Village addresses.

Education

Primary and secondary schools 

Jersey Village is served by Cypress-Fairbanks Independent School District. Jersey Village's residential areas are zoned to Post Elementary School, which is located in Jersey Village. Students continue on to Cook Middle School in unincorporated Harris County and Jersey Village High School in Jersey Village. Some areas within the Jersey Village city limits are zoned to other elementary and middle schools, yet they have no residents.

When Jersey Village opened, children originally went to Cy-Fair High School for schooling. A high school site opened in Jersey Village, and Jersey Village High School opened in 1972.

Gallery of schools

Colleges and universities 
Lone Star College (originally the North Harris Montgomery Community College District) serves the community. The territory in Cypress-Fairbanks ISD joined the community college district in 2000. The Texas Legislature has designated CFISD as being in the Lone Star district.  The system operates the Fairbanks Center in unincorporated Harris County; Fairbanks Center is a part of Lone Star College–CyFair.

Recreation
Jersey Village offers residents a variety of recreational activities. The town has a golf course, public swimming pool, and public park with playground facilities. There is also a small lake owned and maintained by a Homeowners Association with fishing available to residents and guests who have homes on the shores of the lake.

Notable people

Gary Elkins, Republican member of the Texas House of Representatives from District 135 in Harris County from 1995 to 2018 defeated for re-election in 2018

Gallery

See also

References

External links

 City of Jersey Village official website
 

Cities in Texas
Cities in Harris County, Texas
Greater Houston
1956 establishments in Texas